In Greek mythology, King Polydectes  was the ruler of the island of Seriphos.

Family 
Polydectes was the son of either Magnes and an unnamed naiad, or of Peristhenes and Androthoe, or of Poseidon and Cerebia. His story is largely a part of the myth of Perseus, and runs as follows according to the Bibliotheca and John Tzetzes. He was the brother of the fisherman Dictys, who succeeded him on the throne.

Mythology 

Polydectes fell in love with Danaë when she and her son Perseus were saved by his brother Dictys (see: Acrisius). Perseus, old enough by the time, was very protective of his mother and would not allow Polydectes near her. Therefore, Polydectes hatched a plot to get him out of the way. Under the pretense that he was going to marry Hippodamia, he ordered every man in Seriphos to supply him with suitable gifts. His friends were to provide horses but Perseus failed to bring any, so Polydectes announced that he wanted nothing more than the head of the Gorgon Medusa, since Perseus had previously said he was up to a task so harsh as fetching a Gorgon's head. Perseus agreed and Polydectes told him that he could not return to the island without it. Perseus slew Medusa, supposedly using his shield as a mirror to avoid looking at her.

When Perseus returned to Seriphos with the Gorgon's head, he found that, in his absence, his mother was threatened and abused by Polydectes, and had to seek refuge in a temple. Perseus was outraged and strode into the throne room where Polydectes and other nobles were convening. Polydectes was surprised that the hero was still alive and refused to believe Perseus had accomplished the deed he was sent out to do. Perseus protested that he had indeed slain the Gorgon Medusa, and, as proof, revealed her severed head. No sooner had Polydectes and his nobles gazed upon the prize when they were turned to stone.. In a version recorded by Hyginus, Polydectes, fearing the courage of Perseus, made a treacherous attempt on his life, and Perseus only just succeeded in exposing the Gorgon's head in time . Perseus then handed the kingdom of Seriphos over to Dictys.

In an alternate version followed by Hyginus, Polydectes married Danaë as she was brought to him by Dictys, and had Perseus brought up in a temple of Athena. He did not abuse Perseus and Danae, but rather protected them from Acrisius as the latter discovered that they had survived and arrived at Seriphos to kill them. Perseus eventually swore to never kill his grandfather, but Polydectes soon died and at his funeral games Perseus accidentally hit Acrisius with a discus, which resulted in Acrisius' death.

Notes

References 

 Apollodorus, The Library with an English Translation by Sir James George Frazer, F.B.A., F.R.S. in 2 Volumes, Cambridge, MA, Harvard University Press; London, William Heinemann Ltd. 1921. . Online version at the Perseus Digital Library. Greek text available from the same website.
 Gaius Julius Hyginus, Fabulae from The Myths of Hyginus translated and edited by Mary Grant. University of Kansas Publications in Humanistic Studies. Online version at the Topos Text Project.
Pindar, Odes translated by Diane Arnson Svarlien. 1990. Online version at the Perseus Digital Library.
Pindar, The Odes of Pindar including the Principal Fragments with an Introduction and an English Translation by Sir John Sandys, Litt.D., FBA. Cambridge, MA., Harvard University Press; London, William Heinemann Ltd. 1937. Greek text available at the Perseus Digital Library.
Publius Ovidius Naso, Metamorphoses translated by Brookes More (1859-1942). Boston, Cornhill Publishing Co. 1922. Online version at the Perseus Digital Library.
Publius Ovidius Naso, Metamorphoses. Hugo Magnus. Gotha (Germany). Friedr. Andr. Perthes. 1892. Latin text available at the Perseus Digital Library.
 Strabo, The Geography of Strabo. Edition by H.L. Jones. Cambridge, Mass.: Harvard University Press; London: William Heinemann, Ltd. 1924. Online version at the Perseus Digital Library.
 Strabo, Geographica edited by A. Meineke. Leipzig: Teubner. 1877. Greek text available at the Perseus Digital Library.

Kings in Greek mythology
Children of Poseidon
Metamorphoses into inanimate objects in Greek mythology